Yesenia María Restrepo Muñoz (born 3 June 1982) is a Colombian Paralympic athlete. She won the bronze medal in the women's 4 × 100 metres relay T11-T13 event at the 2016 Summer Paralympics held in Rio de Janeiro, Brazil.

She also won the bronze medal in the women's discus throw F11 event at the 2020 Summer Paralympics held in Tokyo, Japan.

References

External links
 

Living people
1982 births
Colombian female discus throwers
Paralympic athletes of Colombia
Athletes (track and field) at the 2016 Summer Paralympics
Athletes (track and field) at the 2020 Summer Paralympics
Medalists at the 2016 Summer Paralympics
Medalists at the 2020 Summer Paralympics
Paralympic bronze medalists for Colombia
Paralympic medalists in athletics (track and field)
Medalists at the 2019 Parapan American Games
Sportspeople from Medellín
20th-century Colombian women
21st-century Colombian women